"In a World Called Catastrophe" is a song by Canadian rock artist Matthew Good. It was released in January 2003 as the second single from his debut solo album, Avalanche. The song reached number 5 on Canada's Singles Chart. As with the previous single "Weapon", the song features accompaniment by the Vancouver Symphony Orchestra. The song was featured on the 8th edition of the Canadian series of Now That's What I Call Music.

Track listing

In A World Called Catastrophe (Radio Edit) - 4:03
In A World Called Catastrophe (Video Version) - 4:40
In A World Called Catastrophe (Album Version) - 5:57

Music video
The music video for "In a World Called Catastrophe" was directed by Kyle Davison and premiered in early 2003. The video has a strong anti-war viewpoint.

Charts

References

External links

2003 singles
Matthew Good songs
Songs written by Matthew Good